William Burt may refer to:

William Burt (writer) (1778–1826), British miscellaneous writer
William Austin Burt (1792–1858), American inventor
William Burt (bishop) (1852–1936), British-American Methodist clergyman, bishop 1904–1924
William Henry Burt (1876–1940), U.S. Army general
William Burt (politician), American state senator in New Mexico

See also
William Burt Pope (1822–1903), theologian
William Burt House (disambiguation)
Burt (disambiguation)